The Billboard Latin Pop Airplay chart ranks the best-performing Spanish-language pop music singles in the United States. Published by Billboard magazine, the data are compiled by Nielsen SoundScan based on each single's weekly airplay.

Chart history

References

United States Latin Pop Airplay
2010
2010 in Latin music